Timmy G Reloaded or Timmy G is a Pakistani sitcom directed by Jawad Bashir and written by Vasay Chaudhry. It is aired on ARY Digital. Sitcom stars Vasay Chaudhry, Ashraf Khan, Hina Javed, Haseeb Khan and Hina Sultan.

Cast 
 Vasay Chaudhry as Timmy G
 Ashraf Khan
 Hina Javed as Pinky
 Haseeb Khan
 Saba Qamar as Herself

Guests 
 Saba Qamar as Herself 
 Saeeda Imtiaz
 Humaira Ali as Nusrat
 Sana Askari
 Sahir Lodhi
 Jan Rambo

References

External links 
 Timmy G Reloaded at the TV.com.pk

ARY Digital original programming
Urdu-language television shows
Pakistani television sitcoms
Pakistani comedy television series